Frederick Bendall (18 December 1865 – 27 April 1941) was an English cricketer. He was a right-handed batsman and right-arm medium-pace bowler who played for Gloucestershire. He was born in Montpellier, Cheltenham and died in Tivoli, Cheltenham.

Bendall made a single first-class appearance for the side, during the 1887 season, against Surrey. From the tailend, he scored a duck in the first innings in which he batted, and 3 runs in the second, as Gloucestershire lost the match by an innings margin.

External links
Frederick Bendall at Cricket Archive 

1865 births
1941 deaths
English cricketers
Gloucestershire cricketers
Sportspeople from Cheltenham